Bania may refer to:

 Bania (caste), also Baniya or Vanika, a trader or merchant belonging to the Indian business class

 Bania (Newar caste), one of the Newar Uray castes of Kathmandu, traders specialising in traditional medicines
 Bănia, a commune in Caraş-Severin County, Romania
 Bănia River, a tributary of the Nera River in Romania
 Bania (region) (or Banovina), a region in Croatia
 Bania, part of the Swoszowice district of Kraków

People with the family name Bania 
 Piotr Bania (born 1973), Polish football player
 Kenny Bania, secondary character on the Seinfeld TV series

See also 
 Banian (disambiguation)
 Banias, an archaeological site at the foot of Mt. Hermon in the Golan Heights
 Banya (disambiguation)
 Banyan (disambiguation)